State Road 355 (NM 355) is a  state highway in the US state of New Mexico. NM 355's southern terminus is at U.S. Route 62 (US 62) and US 180 east-northeast of Carlsbad, and the northern terminus is at the end of state maintenance east-northeast of Carlsbad.

Major intersections

See also

References

355
Transportation in Eddy County, New Mexico